Talbot Nelson Conn “Tolly” Rothwell, OBE (12 November 1916 – 28 February 1981) was an English screenwriter.

Life and career
Rothwell was born in Bromley, Kent, England. He had a variety of jobs during his early life: town clerk, police officer, and Royal Air Force pilot.

He was made a prisoner of war during World War II after being shot down over Norway. It was during this period, while incarcerated in Stalag Luft III, that he started to write. Peter Butterworth was in the same camp and the two became firm friends, with Rothwell mostly writing and Butterworth performing for camp concerts. This helped to relieve the boredom of camp life and the noise of the concerts helped cover tunnelling escape efforts.

After World War II Rothwell took up writing as his profession, writing scripts for The Crazy Gang, Arthur Askey, Ted Ray and Terry-Thomas. His hit play Queen Elizabeth Slept Here ran for 349 performances at the Strand Theatre in London's West End. By the time he submitted a screenplay to Carry On films producer Peter Rogers, he was already an established screenwriter. The first screenplay he submitted, on spec, to series producer Peter Rogers was Carry On Jack, although the first of his screenplays to be filmed was 'Call me a Cab'. It went on to be renamed Carry On Cabby.

Peter Rogers liked Rothwell's writing so much that he asked him to become the Carry On staff writer; Rothwell went on to write a further nineteen Carry On films. He took the series into a more lewd and bawdy direction from that of Carry On'''s first screenwriter, Norman Hudis, but was careful never to stray into pornographic territory. He saw the films as a continuation of music hall entertainment, Max Miller being a hero of his.

Rothwell also wrote several Carry On TV specials for Christmas, and the two series Up Pompeii! starring Frankie Howerd.

Rothwell was awarded the OBE in 1977 for his services to the cinema industry. In the mid 1970s he retired due to a prolonged illness. He spent his final years in Worthing, and died aged 64.

In April 2007, Rothwell's line "Infamy! Infamy! They've all got it in for me!" (delivered by Kenneth Williams in Carry On Cleo) was voted the greatest one-liner in movie history by a thousand comedy writers, actors, impresarios and members of the public for the launch of Sky Movies Comedy Channel. Rothwell "borrowed" the line (with permission) from Frank Muir and Denis Norden, who had used it on their radio show Take It From Here.

Selected filmography

 Is Your Honeymoon Really Necessary? (1953)
 Don't Blame the Stork (1954)
 What Every Woman Wants (1954)
 The Crowded Day (1954)
 My Wife's Family (1956)
 Stars in Your Eyes (1956)
 Make Mine a Million (1959)
 Carry On Spying (1964)
 Carry On Cleo (1964)
 Carry On Jack The Big Job (1965)
 Three Hats for Lisa (1965)
 Carry On Screaming (1966)
 Carry on Loving (1970)
 Carry On Abroad (1972)

References

External links

1916 births
1981 deaths
Officers in English police forces
English male screenwriters
English television writers
Officers of the Order of the British Empire
People from Bromley
Royal Air Force personnel of World War II
World War II prisoners of war held by Germany
British male television writers
20th-century English screenwriters
20th-century English male writers